Nandrolone cypionate (brand names Anabo, Depo-Nortestonate, Dynabol, Nortestrionate, Pluropon, Sterocrinolo), or nandrolone cipionate, also known as 19-nortestosterone 17β-cyclopentanepropionate, is a synthetic androgen and anabolic steroid and a nandrolone ester.

See also
 List of androgen esters § Nandrolone esters

References

Androgens and anabolic steroids
Cypionate esters
Nandrolone esters
Progestogens